Superscope may refer to:

 Superscope (song), a 2014 song and EP by Clark
 Superscope 235 or Super 35, a motion picture film format
 Super Scope, a wireless light gun controller for the Super NES video game console